Stephen Simon Hart (born 15 March 1960) is a Trinidadian football manager and former player.

As a player, Hart began his career with the San Fernando Hurricanes before joining Professional Football League club Texaco in 1979. Leaving Trinidad and Tobago for Canada to study at Saint Mary's University, he represented the university team as well as the Halifax Privateers. Hart joined the San Fernando Strikers briefly before six years with King of Donair. He ended his playing career with Americas.

As a coach, Hart first took over at King of Donair as a player-manager in 1988. He returned to Saint Mary's University as coach of the Huskies women's team, before becoming technical director of Soccer Nova Scotia. Between 2004 and 2012, Hart undertook several roles with the Canadian Soccer Association from under-17 to senior level. In December 2009, he was named head coach of the Canadian national team, and in June 2013 took charge of the Trinidad and Tobago national team. In June 2018, he was named the inaugural head coach of HFX Wanderers FC of the Canadian Premier League. On 13 October 2022 it was announced that the Wanderers had parted ways with Hart.

Club career 
Hart spent his early playing career in his native Trinidad and Tobago, and after progressing in the youth ranks of the San Fernando Hurricanes, joined Professional Football League club Texaco in 1979. He spent a year with the Halifax Privateers before playing for local club the San Fernando Strikers, and joined King of Donair in 1983. He ended his playing career with a brief stint with Americas.

After moving to Halifax, Nova Scotia to continue his education, Hart also played for the Saint Mary's Huskies, the university soccer team, and was named an Atlantic University Sport all-star midfielder. In 2016, Hart was recognised in the Saint Mary's University Sport Hall of Fame.

International career 
In 1980, Hart was called up to the Trinidad and Tobago national team. He earned seven caps.

Coaching career

Early career 
Hart began his coaching career while in university, volunteering his time to coach children. He took his first coaching position in 1989 as a player-manager for semi-professional club King of Donair. Hart coached the team to four consecutive league titles and six cups.

In 1993, he was named technical director of Soccer Nova Scotia and remained in the position for eight years. Hart also served as Nova Scotia's head coach to win bronze medals at the 1993 Canada Games and 2001 Canada Games.

Hart returned to Saint Mary's University to coach the Saint Mary's Huskies women's team for four years.

Canada 
In September 1997, Hart served as assistant coach for the Canada U23 national team at the Jeux de la Francophonie. He was named Canada U17 national team assistant coach in April 2000, and after two years was promoted to head coach of the U17s and Canada U20 national team. He remained with the U17s until May 2007.

Hart was named Canada national team assistant coach in July 2005 under Frank Yallop, and in 2006, stepped in as the senior team's interim coach. He led Canada to a semi-final spot in the CONCACAF Gold Cup but was replaced by Dale Mitchell ahead of 2010 FIFA World Cup qualification.

In April 2009, Hart was named as interim head coach for a second time after the departure of Mitchell. He was named permanent head coach for the first time in December 2009. Hart resigned in October 2012 after suffering an 8–1 loss to Honduras in 2014 FIFA World Cup qualification.

Trinidad and Tobago 

In June 2013, Hart was appointed as manager of the Trinidad and Tobago national team. He was fired in November 2016 and replaced by Belgian coach Tom Saintfiet.

HFX Wanderers 
On 28 June 2018, Hart was announced as the first head coach of Canadian Premier League club HFX Wanderers FC. At the end of the 2022 season, it announced that the Wanderers had parted ways with Hart.

Personal life 
Hart was born in San Fernando, Trinidad and Tobago, and grew up in Marabella and La Romaine. He attended the San Fernando Boys' Government School and St Benedicts College, and graduated from St Mary's University in 1985 with a degree in marine biology.

He is a long-time Halifax resident and lives with his wife, a Nova Scotia native, and their three daughters.

Managerial statistics

Honours

Club
HFX Wanderers
 Canadian Premier League
Runners-up: 2020

Individual
 Canadian Premier League Coach of the Year: 2020

References

External links
 

1960 births
Living people
Association football midfielders
Trinidad and Tobago footballers
People from San Fernando, Trinidad and Tobago
Soccer people from Nova Scotia
Sportspeople from Halifax, Nova Scotia
Trinidad and Tobago emigrants to Canada
Naturalized citizens of Canada
Trinidad and Tobago expatriate footballers
Expatriate soccer players in Canada
Trinidad and Tobago expatriate sportspeople in Canada
Expatriate soccer managers in Canada
United Petrotrin F.C. players
Saint Mary's University (Halifax) alumni
TT Pro League players
Trinidad and Tobago international footballers
Canadian soccer coaches
Trinidad and Tobago football managers
Canada men's national soccer team managers
Trinidad and Tobago national football team managers
2011 CONCACAF Gold Cup managers
2015 CONCACAF Gold Cup managers
HFX Wanderers FC non-playing staff
Canadian Premier League coaches